Khwaabon Ki Zamin Par is an original soap opera of Zindagi television. This fiction show is produced by Anupam Kher. The film stars Ashish Kadian, Megha Chakraborty and Deeksha Sonalkar.

Cast 
 Ashish Kadian as Arya Kashyap (main male lead)
 Megha Chakraborty as Niyati Bajpayee (main female lead)
 Deeksha Sonalkar as Shikha Roy (celebrity actress)
 Saurabh as Mohan Bajpayee
 Rohit Choudhary as Ranjan Awasthi,  Niyati's Jiju
 Astha Agarwal as Arya's co-actor, an established movie star
 Aashish Kaul
 Parichay Sharma
 Aliraza Namdar 
 Gulfam Khan

See also
 Agar Tum Saath Ho

References

Zee Zindagi original programming
2016 Indian television series debuts
2017 Indian television series endings
Indian television series
Indian television soap operas